Hudsonville is an unincorporated community in Harrison Township, Daviess County, Indiana.

History
Hudsonville was laid out in 1856. It was named in honor of a local family. A post office was established at Hudsonville in 1858, and remained in operation until it was discontinued in 1904.

Geography

References

External links

Unincorporated communities in Daviess County, Indiana
Unincorporated communities in Indiana
1856 establishments in Indiana
Populated places established in 1856